The list of shipwrecks in 2003 includes ships sunk, foundered, grounded, or otherwise lost during 2003.

January

1 January

3 January

5 January

11 January

24 January

February

17 February

18 February

March

16 March

21 March

22 March

24 March

April

2 April

11 April

16 April

22 April

29 April

May

13 May

30 May

31 May

June

12 June

14 June

19 June

27 June

July

8 July

17 July

21 July

22 July

28 July

29 July

August

1 August

4 August

15 August

20 August

30 August

September

11 September

25 September

October

8 October

14 October

15 October

25 October

November

7 November

18 November

25 November

December

9 December

24 December

Unknown date

References

2003
Shipwrecks